Bernardo Romero Pereiro (1944–2005) was a Colombian actor, director, and writer. He was the founder of Producciones Bernardo Romero Pereiro. He died at the age of 61 due to a respiratory failure.

External links 
 Fox Telecolombia

1944 births
2005 deaths
Colombian male film actors
Colombian male stage actors
Colombian male telenovela actors
Colombian male television actors
Colombian film directors
Deaths from respiratory failure
Male actors from Bogotá